In four-dimensional Euclidean geometry, the steriruncic tesseractic honeycomb is a uniform space-filling tessellation (or honeycomb) in Euclidean 4-space.

Alternate names
 Prismatorhombated demitesseractic tetracomb (pirhatit)
 Great prismatodemitesseractic tetracomb

Related honeycombs

See also 
Regular and uniform honeycombs in 4-space:
Tesseractic honeycomb
16-cell honeycomb
24-cell honeycomb
Rectified 24-cell honeycomb
Truncated 24-cell honeycomb
Snub 24-cell honeycomb
5-cell honeycomb
Truncated 5-cell honeycomb
Omnitruncated 5-cell honeycomb

Notes

References 
 Kaleidoscopes: Selected Writings of H.S.M. Coxeter, edited by F. Arthur Sherk, Peter McMullen, Anthony C. Thompson, Asia Ivic Weiss, Wiley-Interscience Publication, 1995,  
 (Paper 24) H.S.M. Coxeter, Regular and Semi-Regular Polytopes III, [Math. Zeit. 200 (1988) 3-45]
 George Olshevsky, Uniform Panoploid Tetracombs, Manuscript (2006) (Complete list of 11 convex uniform tilings, 28 convex uniform honeycombs, and 143 convex uniform tetracombs)
  x3o3o *b3x4x - pirhatit - O110

Honeycombs (geometry)
5-polytopes